Gim Du-ryang (1696–1763), also known as Kim Du-ryang, was a painter of the mid Joseon period. He was the son of Gim Hyogyeong, a Hwawon (royal court painter). Gim Duryang followed his father's career by entering the royal service as a member of the Dohwaseo, the official painters of the Joseon court. He was good at almost all genres of painting, including muninhwa (painting in the literal artistic style, sansuhwa (landscape painting), yeongmohwa (animal-and-bird painting) and inmuhwa (portrait painting).

Gallery
Towooart provides a short notice and an argumented selection of paintings.

See also
Korean painting
List of Korean painters
Korean art
Korean culture

References

Bibliography

To be changed

 
 
  

  

1696 births
1763 deaths
18th-century Korean painters
Gim clan of Gyeongju
Court painters